New York City Hall is the seat of New York City government, located at the center of City Hall Park in the Civic Center area of Lower Manhattan, between Broadway, Park Row, and Chambers Street. Constructed from 1803 to 1812, the building is the oldest city hall in the United States that still houses its original governmental functions, such as the office of the Mayor of New York City and the chambers of the New York City Council.  While the Mayor's Office is in the building, the staff of thirteen municipal agencies under mayoral control are located in the nearby Manhattan Municipal Building, one of the largest government buildings in the world, with many others housed in various buildings in the immediate vicinity.

New York City Hall is a National Historic Landmark and is listed on the National Register of Historic Places. The New York City Landmarks Preservation Commission designated both City Hall's exterior and interior as official city landmarks in 1966 and 1976, respectively.

History

Context 
New Amsterdam's first City Hall was built by the Dutch in the 17th century near 73 Pearl Street. The first structure was demolished in 1790. The city's second City Hall, built in 1700, stood on Wall and Nassau Streets. That building was renamed Federal Hall in 1789, after New York became the first official capital of the United States after the Constitution was ratified. It was demolished in 1812 and current Federal Hall was built in 1842.

Plans for building a new City Hall were discussed by the New York City Council as early as 1776, but the financial strains of the war delayed progress. The Council chose a site at the old Common at the northern limits of the city, now City Hall Park. City Hall was originally an area for the first almshouse in 1653. In 1736, there was a financed almshouse for those who were fit to work, for the unfit, and those that were like criminals but were paupers.

Design and construction 

In 1802 the City held a competition for a new City Hall. The first prize of $350 was awarded to Joseph-François Mangin and John McComb Jr. Mangin studied architecture in his native France before becoming a New York City surveyor in 1795 and publishing an official map of the city in 1803 that was largely discredited for its inaccuracies. Mangin later served as the architect of the landmarked St. Patrick's Old Cathedral on Mulberry Street.  McComb, whose father had worked on the old City Hall, was a New Yorker and designed Castle Clinton in Battery Park, among other buildings and structures. Mangin had no known involvement with City Hall after winning the commission. McComb alone supervised every aspect of construction and was in charge of the architectural modifications and detailing during the extended building process.

The cornerstone of the new City Hall was laid on May 26, 1803. Construction was delayed after the City Council objected that the design was too extravagant. In response, McComb reduced the size of the building and used brownstone at the rear of the building to lower costs. The brownstone, along with the original deteriorated Massachusetts marble facade, quarried from Alford, Massachusetts, was later replaced with Alabama limestone between 1954 and 1956. Labor disputes and an outbreak of yellow fever further slowed construction. The building was not dedicated until 1811, and opened officially in 1812.

Usage 
The New York City Police riot occurred in front of New York City Hall between the recently dissolved New York Municipal Police and the newly formed Metropolitan Police on June 16, 1857. Municipal police fought with Metropolitan officers who were attempting to arrest New York City Mayor Fernando Wood.

On July 23, 2003, at 2:08 p.m., City Hall was the scene of a rare political assassination. Othniel Askew, a political rival of City Councilman James E. Davis, opened fire with a pistol from the balcony of the City Council chamber. Askew shot Davis twice, fatally wounding him. A police officer on the floor of the chamber then fatally shot Askew. Askew and Davis had entered the building together without passing through a metal detector, a courtesy extended to elected officials and their guests. As a result of the security breach, then-Mayor Michael Bloomberg revised security policy to require that everyone entering the building pass through metal detectors without exception.

In 2008, work began on a restoration of the building, after a century without a major renovation. The construction included structural enhancements, upgrades to building services, as well as in-depth restoration of much of the interior and exterior. Due to the complexity of the demands of the project, the New York City Department of Design and Construction hired Hill International to provide construction management. Renovations were originally estimated to cost $104 million and take four years, but ended up costing nearly $150 million and taking over five years.

Architecture

Although Mangin and McComb designed the building, which was constructed between 1810 and 1812, it has been altered numerous times over the years by several architects:
 1860: Leopold Eidlitz
 1898: John H. Duncan
 1903: William Martin Aiken
 1907, 1912, 1915, 1917: Grosvenor Atterbury
 1956: Shreve, Lamb & Harmon
 1998: Cabrera Barricklo

The architectural style of City Hall combines international architectural influences, French Renaissance and English neoclassicism. American-Georgian is more evident in the interior design. The design of City Hall influenced at least two later civic structures, the Tweed Courthouse and the Surrogate's Courthouse immediately to the north.  City Hall is a New York City designated landmark. It is also listed on the New York State and National Registers of Historic Places.

Exterior 
The building consists of a central pavilion with two projecting wings. The entrance, reached by a long flight of steps, has figured prominently in civic events for over a century and a half. There is a columned entrance portico capped by a balustrade, and another balustrade at the roof. The domed tower in the center was rebuilt in 1917 after the last of two major fires. The original Massachusetts marble facade, quarried from Alford, Massachusetts, and complemented with brownstone on the rear elevation, had deteriorated over time from pollution and pigeons. It was completely reclad in Alabama limestone above a Missouri granite base in 1954–56 by Shreve, Lamb & Harmon, architects of the Empire State Building.

The steps of City Hall frequently provide a backdrop for political demonstrations and press conferences concerning city politics. Live, unedited coverage of events at City Hall is carried on NYC Media channel 74, a City Government-access television (GATV) official cable TV channel.

Fencing surrounds the building's perimeter, with a strong security presence by the New York City Police Department. Public access to the building is restricted to tours and to those with specific business appointments.

Interior 

On the inside, the rotunda is a soaring space with a grand marble stairway rising up to the second floor, where ten fluted Corinthian columns support the coffered dome, which was added in a 1912 restoration by Grosvenor Atterbury. The rotunda has been the site of municipal as well as national events. Abraham Lincoln's coffin was placed on the staircase landing across the rotunda when he lay in state in 1865 after his assassination. Ulysses S. Grant also lay in state beneath the soaring rotunda dome – as did Colonel Elmer Ephraim Ellsworth, first Union officer killed in the Civil War and commander of the 11th New York Volunteer Infantry Regiment (First Fire Zouaves).

There are 108 paintings from the late 18th century through the 20th. The New York Times declared it "almost unrivaled as an ensemble, with several masterpieces." Among the collection is John Trumbull's 1805 portrait of Alexander Hamilton, the source of the face on the United States ten-dollar bill. There were significant efforts to restore the paintings in the 1920s and 1940s. In 2006 a new restoration campaign began for 47 paintings identified by the Art Commission as highest in priority.

Official receptions are held in the Governor's Room, which has hosted many dignitaries including the Marquis de Lafayette and Albert Einstein. The building's Governor's Room hosted President-elect Abraham Lincoln in 1861. The Governor's Room, which is used for official receptions, also houses one of the most important collections of 19th-century American portraiture and notable artifacts such as George Washington's desk.

Other notable rooms include:
 The Outer Room is adjacent to the traditional Mayor's office, which is a small space on the northwest corner of the first floor.
 The Ceremonial Room is where the mayor would meet officials and hold small group meetings.
 The Blue Room is where New York City mayors have been giving official press conferences for decades and is often used for bill-signing ceremonies.
 Room 9 is the press room at City Hall where reporters file stories in cramped quarters.

Surroundings

Neighborhood
The area around City Hall is commonly referred to as the Civic Center. Most of the neighborhood consists of government offices (city, state, and federal), as well as an increasing number of upscale residential dwellings being converted from older commercial structures. Architectural landmarks surround City Hall, including St. Paul's Chapel, St. Peter's Church, the Home Life Building, the Rogers Peet Building, and the Woolworth Building to the west; the Broadway–Chambers Building to the northwest; 280 Broadway, 49 Chambers, Tweed Courthouse, and Surrogate's Courthouse to the north; the Manhattan Municipal Building to the northeast; the Brooklyn Bridge to the east; and the New York Times Building, the Potter Building, and the Park Row Building to the southwest. City Hall Park is approximately three blocks away from the World Trade Center to the west. Pace University's New York City campus is located across Park Row from City Hall.

Subway stations
Located directly under City Hall Park is the former City Hall subway station, the original southern terminal of the first service of the New York City Subway built by the Interborough Rapid Transit Company (IRT). Opened on October 27, 1904, this station beneath the public area in front of City Hall was designed to be the showpiece of the new subway. The platform and mezzanine feature Guastavino tile, skylights, colored glass tile work and brass chandeliers. Passenger service was discontinued on December 31, 1945, although the station is still used as a turning loop for  trains.

Another station named City Hall also exists on the BMT Broadway Line, albeit on the western side of City Hall and not directly under it. This station was built in 1918 for the Brooklyn–Manhattan Transit Corporation (BMT).

Other nearby, open subway stations are Brooklyn Bridge–City Hall/Chambers Street and Chambers Street–World Trade Center/Park Place/Cortlandt Street.

As a geographic center
Google Maps uses New York City Hall as the zero-mile point from which distances from New York City are measured.

In popular culture

New York City Hall has played a central role in several films and television series. Examples include:
 Spin City (1996–2002), set in City Hall, starred Michael J. Fox as a Deputy Mayor making efforts to stop the dim-witted Mayor from embarrassing himself in front of the media and voters.
 City Hall (1996) starred Al Pacino as an idealistic Mayor and John Cusack as his Deputy Mayor, who leads an investigation with unexpectedly far-reaching consequences into an accidental shooting.
 In the 1984 movie Ghostbusters the Mayor summons the protagonists to City Hall to discuss the impending end of the world.
 City Hall is also referred to in the folk song "The Irish Rover" as performed by The Clancy Brothers, The Pogues and The Dubliners:

In the year of our Lord, eighteen hundred and six,
We set sail from the Coal Quay of Cork
We were sailing away with a cargo of bricks
For the grand City Hall in New York

 Although the dates match those of City Hall, there is no recorded usage of Irish bricks in the building's construction. However the song mentions that the Irish Rover never actually arrived in New York, but "struck a rock" and sank instead.
 In the 2016 film Fantastic Beasts and Where to Find Them, part of J. K. Rowling's Wizarding World, Senator Henry Shaw (played by Josh Cowdery) holds a fundraising dinner at City Hall for his re-election; this dinner is later disrupted by a magical force that attacks him while he is delivering a speech. St George's Hall, in Liverpool, stands in for the City Hall in both interior and exterior scenes.

See also
 City Hall Post Office and Courthouse (New York City)—formerly located in the southwest corner of the park
 Gracie Mansion
 List of New York City borough halls and municipal buildings
 List of New York City Designated Landmarks in Manhattan below 14th Street
 National Historic Landmarks in New York City
 National Register of Historic Places listings in Manhattan below 14th Street

References

External links

 New York Architecture Images- City Hall (and City Hall Subway Station)
 Archaeological Institute of America The City Hall Park Project Archaeology, February 12, 2007.
 "'Drawn By New York' At The New-York Historical Society" on the Antiques and the Arts Online website

Broadway (Manhattan)
City and town halls on the National Register of Historic Places in New York (state)
Civic Center, Manhattan
Clock towers in New York City
Government buildings completed in 1812
Government buildings in Manhattan
Government buildings on the National Register of Historic Places in Manhattan
Government buildings with domes
Government of New York City
John McComb Jr. buildings
National Historic Landmarks in Manhattan
New York City Designated Landmarks in Manhattan
New York City interior landmarks
1812 establishments in New York (state)